John Donnelly (born September 28, 1948) is a Canadian former professional ice hockey defenceman. During the 1972–73 season, Donnelly played 15 games in the World Hockey Association with the Ottawa Nationals.

References

External links

1948 births
Living people
Anglophone Quebec people
Broome Dusters players
Canadian ice hockey defencemen
Clinton Comets players
Ice hockey people from Montreal
Mohawk Valley Comets players
Ottawa Nationals players
Canadian expatriate ice hockey players in the United States